This is a list of events and openings related to amusement parks that occurred in 2014. These various lists are not exhaustive.

Amusement parks

Opening
 China Chimelong Ocean Kingdom – 4 March 2014
 Italy Cinecittà World
 France Kingoland
 China Quancheng Euro Park - 27 April 2014
 Jordan Red Sea Astratrium
 China Romon World
 Russia Sochi Park Adventureland
 China Yancheng Happy Valley – 1 January 2014

Reopened

USA Kentucky Kingdom – 24 May

Change of name
 USA Knott's Soak City (Palm Springs) » Wet'n'Wild Palm Springs
 USA Six Flags Kentucky Kingdom » Kentucky Kingdom
 USA Splashtown » Wet'n'Wild SplashTown
 USA Splash Adventure » Alabama Splash Adventure

Birthday

 USA Mt. Olympus Water & Theme Park – 10th birthday
 Netherlands Walibi Holland – 20th birthday
 Australia Aussie World – 25th birthday
 USA Disney's Hollywood Studios – 25th birthday
 France Parc Astérix – 25th birthday
 France Puy du Fou – 25th birthday
 France Walygator Parc – 25th birthday
 Sweden Skara Sommarland – 30th birthday
 UK Thorpe Park – 35th birthday
 USA Six Flags Great Adventure – 40th birthday
 USA Morey's Piers – 45th birthday
 USA SeaWorld San Diego – 50th birthday
 USA Universal Studios Hollywood – 50th birthday
 Japan Yomiuriland – 50th birthday
 UK Flamingoland – 55th birthday
 Belgium Bellewaerde – 60th birthday
 USA Story Land – 60th birthday
 USA The Great Escape & Splashwater Kingdom – 60th birthday
 USA Dorney Park & Wildwater Kingdom – 130th birthday
 USA Kings Dominion – 40th birthday

Closed
 USA HoffMan PlayLand – 2014
 South Korea Daejanggeum Theme Park – January 1

Additions

Roller coasters

New

Relocated

Refurbished

Other attractions

New

Refurbished

Closed attractions & roller coasters

Records broken

Themed Accommodation

New

See also
 List of roller coaster rankings

Notes

References

External links
 Listing of 2014 roller coaster openings at the Roller Coaster DataBase
 Listing of 2014 roller coaster closures at the Roller Coaster DataBase

Amusement parks by year
Amusement parks